Phylloporia latipennella is a moth of the  family Incurvariidae. It was described by Zeller in 1877. It is found in South America.

References

Moths described in 1877
Incurvariidae